Montana Highway 16 (MT 16) is a  state highway in the US state of Montana. It begins in West Glendive at a Business Loop of Interstate 94 (I-94), and ends at the Port of Raymond on the Saskatchewan border. The northern portion from U.S. Route 2 (US 2) at Culbertson to the Canada–United States border is proposed as part of the Theodore Roosevelt Expressway.

Route description

MT 16 begins in West Glendive, across the Yellowstone River from Glendive, at an intersection with a business loop of Interstate 94. It proceeds north, crossing under I-94 before turning northeast to follow the left bank of the Yellowstone River and the Yellowstone Valley Railroad. After crossing from Dawson into Richland counties and passing through Knife River and Crane, the road meets MT 23 and MT 200 south of Sidney. With MT 200, the road continues into Sidney, then MT 16 leaves westwards on the northern outskirts of town and swings northwest, heading away from the North Dakota state line.

Leaving the Yellowstone Valley, MT 16 heads cross-country towards Culbertson, crossing the Missouri River a few miles south of town and entering Roosevelt County there. In Culbertson itself, the road meets US 2, then leaves north, passing Froid's western outskirts and then crossing into Sheridan County. Soon, it passes through the Medicine Lake National Wildlife Refuge, nearby Medicine Lake, and then swings around in an arc to a junction with MT 5, just southeast of Plentywood. The two highways have a concurrency through town, before MT 16 leaves northwards. It then has a clear run to the Canada–US border, continuing on as Saskatchewan Highway 6, connecting to Regina and beyond to Saskatoon.

Major intersections

References

016
Theodore Roosevelt Expressway